Asus Memo Pad may refer to:

 Asus Memo Pad 7
 Asus Memo Pad HD 7
 Asus Memo Pad 8